Graeme Farrell (born 2 November 1947) is an Australian former cricketer. Farrel played in seven first-class matches for Tasmania for five years; between 1965 and 1970.

See also
 List of Tasmanian representative cricketers

References

External links
 

1947 births
Living people
Australian cricketers
Tasmania cricketers
Cricketers from Launceston, Tasmania